The Riddell Football Netball Club, nicknamed the Bombers, is an Australian rules football club located 53 km north west of Melbourne in the town of Riddells Creek affiliated with the Riddell District Football League.

Premierships
Riddell District Football League

Football
Seniors (15)
1905, 1912, 1947, 1970, 1980, 1982, 1990, 1991, 1992, 2005, 2006, 2008, 2010, 2013, 2022, 2030
Reserves (2)
1982, 2004, 2012
Thirds (3)
1966, 2005, 2006, 2012

Netball
A grade
2005, 2006, 2007
B grade
2003, 2005 2010
C grade
2010, 2012

Former players in the AFL
 Jarryd Allen- 
Tom Sheridan- Fremantle and GWS

References

Website
http://www.riddell.sportingpulse.net

Books
History of Football in the Bendigo District - John Stoward - 
100 years of Football in the Riddell District - John Stoward

Riddell District Football League clubs
1888 establishments in Australia
Australian rules football clubs established in 1888